Healing Force is an album by American jazz pianist Don Pullen recorded in 1976 for the Italian Black Saint label.

Reception
The Allmusic review awarded the album 4 stars.

Track listing
All compositions by Don Pullen
 "Pain Inside" - 15:51 
 "Tracey's Blues" - 8:32 
 "Healing Force" - 8:28 
 "Keep on Steppin'" - 18:42
Recorded at Barigozzi Studio in Milano, Italy on October 23, 1976

Personnel
Don Pullen - piano

References

Black Saint/Soul Note albums
Don Pullen albums
Solo piano jazz albums
1976 albums